Poochini (also known as Poochini's Yard) is a short-lived animated television series which was originally aired worldwide on February 2, 2000, but it did not air in the United States until September 1, 2002. The series follows the life of a  grey black-eared Hound mix named Poochini who runs away from home after his rich owner dies, gets captured by the dog pound and is adopted by an average American family.

Despite being created and co-produced by the San Francisco-based entertainment company Wild Brain, Poochini was not shown in the United States for over two years after its production. Co-produced and internationally distributed by Munich-based media group EM.TV, Poochini is based on the award-winning pilot short A Dog Cartoon (1999).

Poochini had only made 26 episodes with the final one airing in the United States on March 1, 2003. The series was aired on syndication, The WB 100+ Station Group and Toon Disney in the United States, Teletoon in Canada, Nickelodeon in Latin America, ITV1 (CITV) in the United Kingdom, TG4 (Cúla4) in Ireland, Télétoon+ (formerly Télétoon) and TF1 (TF! Jeunesse) in France, Junior and ProSieben in Germany, M-Net (K-T.V.) in Africa, Disney Channel and Boomerang in Asia, MBC 3 in the Middle East, Arutz HaYeladim in Israel, Dubai TV in the United Arab Emirates, IRIB TV2 in Iran, Cartoon Network India and Cartoon Network Pakistan in South Asia, CCTV-14, Dragon Club and Shanghai Toonmax Cartoon TV in China, Nickelodeon Australia & New Zealand in Oceania, the Seven Network in Australia and TVNZ in New Zealand and ANTV in Indonesia.

It was directed by Dave Marshall and Dave Thomas. The series was one of the final projects of the background artist named Maurice Noble, who is credited as a design and color consultant.

Voice cast
 Billy West - Poochini, Walter White, Mr. Garvey, Lockjaw
 Dee Bradley Baker - Billy White, Bunk, Knucklehead, Snubnose
 Maurice LaMarche - Dirt
 Leslie Carrara-Rudolph - Wendy White
 Katie Crown - Wendy White (Season 2)
 Eric Bauza - Walter White (Season 2)
 Jeff Bennett - Additional Voices 
 John Cygan - Additional Voices
 Daran Norris - Additional Voices
 Grey DeLisle - Additional Voices
 Kath Soucie - Additional Voices 
 Corey Burton - Additional Voices 
 Rob Paulsen - Additional Voices 
 David Winn - Additional Voices

Episodes
All episodes directed by Dave Marshall and Dave Thomas.

References

External links 
 

2000s American animated television series
2002 American television series debuts
2003 American television series endings
2000 German television series debuts
American children's animated comedy television series
American children's animated adventure television series
German children's animated comedy television series
German children's animated adventure television series
Animated television series about dogs
English-language television shows
Television series by DHX Media